Doug Preis is an American voice actor, best known for his role as Phil Funnie, Chalky Studebaker, Willie White, Walter "Skunky" Beaumont, Bill Bluff and Vice Principal Lamarr Bone on Doug.

Roles
 Doug - Mr. Phil Funnie, Chalky, Willie, Skunky, Monroe Yoder and Clyde ("Chap") Lipman (both of The Beets), Mr. Bluff and Mr. Lamarr Bone
 Hoyt 'n Andy's Sports Bender - Hoyt
 Phred on Your Head Show - Phred, Big Voice
 The URL with Phred Show - Phred, Big Voice
 PB&J Otter - Redolfo
 The World of Tosh - Ralph Anderson/Elderly Man (in the episode "How Termitey Have Fallen") (English dub, uncredited)
 Cartoon Network - Announcer (2002–04)
 Lucky Charms - Lucky the Leprechaun
 ThunderCats - Alluro, Lynx-O
 Vlasic Pickles - Jovny the Stork
 Adventures of the Galaxy Rangers - Shane Gooseman, Nimrod the Cat
 Adult Swim - Announcer
 Harvey Birdman, Attorney at Law - Thundarr the Barbarian, Beegle Beagle
 ''Animals United - Hunter

References

External links

Living people
American male voice actors
Monmouth University alumni
1953 births